Parowa  is a settlement in the administrative district of Gmina Brusy, within Chojnice County, Pomeranian Voivodeship, in northern Poland.

The settlement has a population of 9.

References

Parowa